Mexico competed at the 2014 Summer Youth Olympics, in Nanjing, China from 16 August to 28 August 2014.

Medalists

Archery

Mexico qualified two archers from its performance at the 2013 World Archery Youth Championships.

Individual

Team

Athletics

Mexico qualified 7 athletes to compete in the following events.

Qualification Legend: Q=Final A (medal); qB=Final B (non-medal); qC=Final C (non-medal); qD=Final D (non-medal); qE=Final E (non-medal)

Boys
Track & road events

Field Events

Girls
Track & road events

Field events

Badminton

Mexico qualified two athletes based on the 2 May 2014 BWF Junior World Rankings.

Singles

Doubles

Boxing

Mexico qualified one boxer based on its performance at the 2014 AIBA Youth World Championships

Boys

Canoeing

Mexico qualified one boat based on its performance at the 2013 World Junior Canoe Sprint and Slalom Championships.

Girls

Cycling

Mexico qualified a boys' and girls' team based on its ranking issued by the UCI.

Team

Mixed Relay

Diving

Mexico qualified four quotas, representing by two athletes, based on its performance at the Nanjing 2014 Diving Qualifying Event.

Fencing

Mexico qualified one athlete at the 2014 Cadet World Championships.

Girls

Mixed Team

Field Hockey

Mexico qualified a boys' team based on its performance at the 2014 Youth American Championship.

Boys' Tournament

Roster

José Alan Hernández
Irving Barush Chávez
Miguel Ángel Othón Moreno
José Jesús Montaño
Daniel Rangel
Iván Carballo
Alejandro Méndez
Agustín Valdez
Reymundo Lemus

Group Stage

Quarterfinal

Crossover

Seventh and eighth place

Football

Mexico qualified in the girls competition.

Girls' Tournament

Roster

Mariana Maldonado
Montserrat Hernández
Joselyn Cázares
Alejandra Zaragoza
Vanessa Rodríguez
Ana Karen Saucedo
Kelsey Brann Hernández
Alma López
Vanessa Rodríguez
Elizabeth Anguiano
María Akemi Carreón
Paulina Gutiérrez
Vannya García
Daniela García
María del Carmen Acedo
Alexia Delgado
Dulce Eileen Martínez
Jimena López

Group stage

Semi-final

Bronze medal match

Golf

Mexico qualified one team of two athletes based on the 8 June 2014 IGF Combined World Amateur Golf Rankings.

Individual

Team

Gymnastics

Artistic Gymnastics

Mexico qualified two athletes based on its performance at the 2014 Junior Pan American Artistic Gymnastics Championships.

Boys

Girls

Rhythmic Gymnastics

Mexico qualified one athlete based on its performance at the 2014 Junior Pan American Rhythmic Championships.

Individual

Trampoline
Mexico qualified two athletes based on its performance at the 2014 Junior Pan American Trampoline Championships.

Modern Pentathlon

Mexico qualified one athlete based on its performance at the PANAM YOG Qualifiers and another based on its performance at the 2014 Youth A World Championships.

Sailing

Mexico qualified two boats; one based on its performance at the Byte CII North American & Caribbean Continental Qualifier and the other based on its performance at the Techno 293 North American & Caribbean Continental Qualifier.

Shooting

Mexico qualified three athletes at the 2014 American Qualification Tournament.

The three quotas places that Mexico obtained were thanks to José Santos Valdés who finished in the 2nd place at the Men's Air Rifle event, to Lia Borgo Torres who ended 1st at the Women Air Rifle event and Ana Paula Ruiz who won the Women 10m Air Pistol event. All of this events were held al the 2014 ISSF Cup Pistol/Rifle, Fort Benning.

Individual

Team

Swimming

Mexico qualified four swimmers.

Boys

Girls

Taekwondo

Mexico qualified four athletes based on its performance at the Taekwondo Qualification Tournament.

Boys

Girls

Tennis

Mexico qualified one athlete based on the 9 June 2014 ITF World Junior Rankings.

Singles

Doubles

Triathlon

Mexico qualified two athletes based on its performance at the 2014 American Youth Olympic Games Qualifier.

Individual

Relay

Weightlifting

Mexico qualified 2 quotas in the boys' events and 2 quotas in the girls' events based on the team ranking after the 2013 Weightlifting Youth World Championships.

Boys

Girls

Wrestling

Mexico qualified two athletes based on its performance at the 2014 Pan American Cadet Championships.

Boys

References

2014 in Mexican sports
Nations at the 2014 Summer Youth Olympics
Mexico at the Youth Olympics